Robert Stanton Avery (1808–1894) was an American mathematician.

Biography 
Stanton Avery was born in 1808. In 1846, he graduated from Harvard Divinity School, and soon after turned his attention to mathematics and physical sciences. He taught math in schools in the South, until he was drafted into the United States Coast Survey, during which he became the Chief of the Tidal Division. In 1885, he was retired from USCS, and devoted his last years to the development of the techniques of phonetic spelling. He died in 1894.

References 

19th-century American mathematicians
1808 births
1894 deaths
Harvard Divinity School alumni
United States Coast Survey personnel